Jian Fang Lay-Hong (born 6 March 1973), is a right-handed Chinese-born Australian ladies table tennis player. She plays penhold, with a long pimple rubber at one side for use of attacking, blocking as well as chopping. She is currently number 1 female player in Australia, as well as number 141 in the world. 

At the 2020 Tokyo Olympics Lay-Hong became the first Australian woman to compete at 6 Olympic games.  She won her first 3 matches but then lost in Round 3 to Han Ying of Germany 4-0 so did not advance to the round of 16. She also competed with Michelle Bromley and Melissa Tapper in the women's team event but were defeated by Germany 3-0 in the round of 16. Australia at the 2020 Summer Olympics details the results in depth.

Born in Wenzhou, China, Lay moved to Melbourne in the early 1990s and eventually became a three-time Victorian champion as well as winning several titles in other Victorian tournaments. She was selected in the Australian national team in 1994 and participated in the Sydney, Athens, Beijing, London, Rio de Janeiro and Tokyo  Olympic Games. Lay also competed at the 2002, 2006 and 2014 Commonwealth Games, where she took home a total of four silver and three bronze medals.

In June 2008, she returned to the position of number one female tennis table player in Victoria and Australia after staying at the number 3 spot since 2007. She was first qualified for the Beijing Olympics after beating Stephanie Sang at the Oceania Qualifiers at Nouméa, New Caledonia.

See also
 List of table tennis players

References 

 Australian Olympic Committee profile

1973 births
Living people
Australian female table tennis players
Olympic table tennis players of Australia
Table tennis players at the 2000 Summer Olympics
Table tennis players at the 2004 Summer Olympics
Table tennis players at the 2008 Summer Olympics
Table tennis players at the 2012 Summer Olympics
Table tennis players at the 2016 Summer Olympics
Table tennis players at the 2020 Summer Olympics
Chinese emigrants to Australia
Table tennis players from Zhejiang
Table tennis players at the 2002 Commonwealth Games
Table tennis players at the 2006 Commonwealth Games
Table tennis players at the 2014 Commonwealth Games
Sportspeople from Wenzhou
Commonwealth Games medallists in table tennis
Commonwealth Games silver medallists for Australia
Commonwealth Games bronze medallists for Australia
Naturalised table tennis players
Table tennis players at the 2018 Commonwealth Games

Naturalised citizens of Australia
Medallists at the 2002 Commonwealth Games
Medallists at the 2006 Commonwealth Games
Medallists at the 2014 Commonwealth Games
Medallists at the 2022 Commonwealth Games